William Joseph Casey (March 13, 1913 – May 6, 1987) was the Director of Central Intelligence from 1981 to 1987.  In this capacity he oversaw the entire United States Intelligence Community and personally directed the Central Intelligence Agency (CIA).

Education 
A native of the Elmhurst section of Queens, New York, Casey was raised as a devout Roman Catholic in Bellmore, New York and graduated from the Jesuit-affiliated Fordham University in 1934. He continued his education at other Catholic institutions, completing graduate work at the Catholic University of America before earning an LL.B. from St. John's University School of Law in 1937.

Career

Early career 
Following his admission to the bar, he was a partner in the New York–based Buckner, Casey, Doran and Siegel from 1938 to 1942. Concurrently, as chairman of the board of editors of the Research Institute of America (1938–1949), Casey initially conceptualized the tax shelter and "explained to businessmen how little they need[ed] to do in order to stay on the right side of New Deal regulatory legislation."

World War II & OSS 
During World War II, he worked for the Office of Strategic Services, where he became head of its Secret Intelligence Branch in Europe. He served in the United States Naval Reserve until December 1944 before remaining in his OSS position as a civilian until his resignation in September 1945; as an officer, he attained the rank of lieutenant and was awarded the Bronze Star Medal for meritorious achievement.

Postwar business and government career 
Following the dissolution of the OSS in September 1945, Casey returned to his legal and business ventures. After serving as a special counsel to the United States Senate (1947–1948) and associate general counsel to the Point Four Program (1948), Casey founded the Institute for Business Planning in 1950; there, he amassed much of his early wealth (compounded by investments) by writing early data-driven publications on business law. He was a lecturer in tax law at the New York University School of Law from 1948 to 1962. From 1957 to 1971, he was a partner at Hall, Casey, Dickler & Howley, a New York corporate law firm, under the auspices of founding partner and prominent Republican politician Leonard W. Hall. He ran as a Republican for New York's 3rd congressional district in 1966, but was defeated in the primary by former Congressman Steven Derounian.

Nixon & Ford administrations 
He served in the Nixon administration as the chairman of the Securities and Exchange Commission from 1971 to 1973; this position led to his being called as a prosecution witness against former Attorney General John N. Mitchell and former Commerce Secretary Maurice Stans in an influence-peddling case stemming from international financier Robert Vesco's $200,000 contribution to the Nixon reelection campaign.

He then served as Under Secretary of State for Economic Affairs (1973–1974) and chairman of the Export-Import Bank of the United States (1974–1976). During this era, he was also a member of the President's Foreign Intelligence Advisory Board (1975–1976) and of counsel to Rogers & Wells (1976–1981).

Return to private work 
With Antony Fisher, he co-founded the Manhattan Institute in 1978. He is the father-in-law of Owen Smith, Chairman of the Board of Trustees of the Institute of World Politics and Professor Emeritus at Long Island University.

Reagan campaign & transition 

As campaign manager of Ronald Reagan's successful presidential campaign in 1980, Casey helped to broker Reagan's unlikely alliance with vice presidential nominee George H. W. Bush. He then served on the transition team following the election.

Director of Central Intelligence 

After Reagan took office, Reagan named Casey to the post of Director of Central Intelligence (DCI). Outgoing Director Stansfield Turner characterized the appointment as the "Resurrection of Wild Bill," referring to Bill Donovan, the brilliant and eccentric head of Office of Strategic Services in World War II, whom Casey had known and greatly admired.

Despite Casey's background in intelligence, the position was not his first choice; according to Rhoda Koenig, he only agreed to take the appointment after being assured that "he could have a hand in shaping foreign policy rather than simply reporting the data on which it was based." Breaking precedent, Reagan elevated the role to a Cabinet-level position for the duration of Casey's appointment.

Ronald Reagan used prominent Catholics in his government to brief Pope John Paul II of developments in the Cold War. Casey would fly secretly to Rome in a windowless C-141 black jet and "be taken undercover to the Vatican.

Casey oversaw the re-expansion of the Intelligence Community to funding and human resource levels greater than those existing before the preceding Carter Administration; in particular, he increased levels within the CIA. During his tenure, post-Watergate and Church Committee restrictions were controversially lifted on the use of the CIA to directly and covertly influence the internal and foreign affairs of countries relevant to American policy.

This period of the Cold War saw an increase in the Agency's global, anti-Soviet activities, which started under the Carter Doctrine in late 1980.

Iran–Contra affair

Casey was suspected, by some, of involvement with the controversial Iran-Contra affair, in which Reagan administration personnel secretly traded arms to the Islamic Republic of Iran, and secretly diverted some of the resulting income to aid the rebel Contras in Nicaragua, in violation of U.S. law. Casey was called to testify before Congress about his knowledge of the affair. On 15 December 1986, one day before Casey was scheduled to testify before Congress, Casey suffered two seizures and was hospitalized. Three days later, Casey underwent surgery for a previously undiagnosed brain tumor. While hospitalized, Casey died less than 24 hours after former colleague Richard Secord testified that Casey supported the illegal aiding of the Contras.

In his November 1987 book, Veil: The Secret Wars of the CIA 1981–1987, Washington Post reporter and biographer Bob Woodward, who had interviewed Casey on a number of occasions for the biography, said that he had gained entry into Casey's hospital room for a final, four-minute encounter—a claim which was met with disbelief in many quarters as well as an adamant denial from Casey's wife, Sofia. According to Woodward, when Casey was asked if he knew about the diversion of funds to the Nicaraguan Contras, "His head jerked up hard. He stared, and finally nodded yes."

In his final report (submitted in August 1993), Independent Counsel Lawrence E. Walsh indicated evidence of Casey's involvement:

There is evidence that Casey played a role as a Cabinet-level advocate both in setting up the covert network to resupply the contras during the Boland funding cut-off, and in promoting the secret arms sales to Iran in 1985 and 1986. In both instances, Casey was acting in furtherance of broad policies established by President Reagan.

There is evidence that Casey, working with two national security advisers to President Reagan during the period 1984 through 1986—Robert C. McFarlane and Vice Admiral John M. Poindexter—approved having these operations conducted out of the National Security Council staff with Lt. Col. Oliver L. North as the action officer, assisted by retired Air Force Maj. Gen. Richard V. Secord. And although Casey tried to insulate himself and the CIA from any illegal activities relating to the two secret operations ... there is evidence that he was involved in at least some of those activities and may have attempted to keep them concealed from Congress.

However, Walsh also wrote: "Independent Counsel obtained no documentary evidence showing Casey knew about or approved the diversion. The only direct testimony linking Casey to early knowledge of the diversion came from [Oliver] North." Posthumously, the House October Surprise Task Force eventually exonerated Casey after first holding hearings to establish a need for investigation, the outcome of the investigation, the response of Casey's family to the task force's closure of the investigation, and Walsh's final Independent Counsel report.

Personal life
Casey was a member of the Knights of Malta. 

In 1948, he purchased Locust Knoll, an  North Shore estate centered around a main 1854 Jacobethan house in Roslyn Harbor, New York, for $50,000. After renaming the estate Mayknoll, it remained his principal residence until his death.

Death 
Casey died of a brain tumor on May 6, 1987, at the age of 74. His Requiem Mass was said by Fr. Daniel Fagan, then pastor of St. Mary's Roman Catholic Church in Roslyn, New York, and his funeral was led by Bishop John R. McGann, who used his pulpit to castigate Casey for his ethics and actions in Nicaragua. It was attended by President Reagan and the First Lady. Casey is buried in the Cemetery of the Holy Rood in Westbury, New York.

He was survived by his wife, the former Sophia Kurz (d. 2000), and his daughter, Bernadette Casey Smith.

See also 
 George Doundoulakis
 Helias Doundoulakis
 Killing Reagan (film)
 List of notable brain tumor patients

References 

 Joseph E. Persico. Casey: The Lives and Secrets of William J. Casey-From the Oss to the CIA (1991)
 Casey was featured prominently in Bob Woodward's book Veil: The Secret Wars of the CIA.
 Casey's role in the Afghanistan War in Steve Coll's book Ghost Wars: The Secret History of the CIA, Afghanistan, and Bin Laden, From the Soviet Invasion to September 10, 2001.

External links 

 
Inventory of the William J. Casey Papers and selected documents online at the Hoover Institution Archives, Stanford University.

|-

|-

1913 births
1987 deaths
20th-century American politicians
American campaign managers
Catholics from New York (state)
American spies
Burials at the Cemetery of the Holy Rood
Deaths from brain cancer in the United States
Directors of the Central Intelligence Agency
Fordham University alumni
Iran–Contra affair
Knights of Malta
Members of the U.S. Securities and Exchange Commission
New York (state) Republicans
People from Elmhurst, Queens
People of the Office of Strategic Services
Reagan administration cabinet members
St. John's University School of Law alumni
Nixon administration personnel
United States Navy personnel of World War II
United States Navy officers
United States Navy reservists